Syed Ghulam Moinuddin (born 17 February 1958) is a former field hockey player from Pakistan. He was the member of the winning Pakistani team in 1984 Summer Olympics. He was born in Islamabad.

References

External links
 

1958 births
Living people
Pakistani male field hockey players
Medalists at the 1984 Summer Olympics
Olympic gold medalists for Pakistan
Field hockey players at the 1984 Summer Olympics
Field hockey players at the 1986 Asian Games
Asian Games medalists in field hockey
Asian Games silver medalists for Pakistan
Medalists at the 1986 Asian Games
Olympic medalists in field hockey
20th-century Pakistani people